The Renaissance is the tenth Korean-language studio album (thirteenth overall) by South Korean boy band Super Junior, released on March 16, 2021, by SM Entertainment. The album features the vocals of nine Super Junior members, which are Leeteuk, Heechul, Yesung, Shindong, Eunhyuk, Donghae, Siwon, Ryeowook and Kyuhyun.

Background
On November 6, 2020, Super Junior pre-released the song "The Melody" to celebrate their 15th anniversary. Leeteuk and Yesung took part in writing the lyrics.

The album was originally planned to be released in December 2020. However, Label SJ dropped an official statement in their official Twitter account on December 9, 2020, stating that the release of the album had been delayed to January 2021. On January 8, 2021, Label SJ announced the release date of the album, which was set on February 16, 2021. However, Label SJ once again delayed the release of the album on February 1, 2021, due to unavoidable circumstances. It stated that the release of the album had been pushed back to March 16, 2021.

Promotion

Live performances
On March 16, 2021, Super Junior made their comeback, "Super Junior Comeback Show 'House Party'", through Mnet. They performed their title song, "House Party", in the show. They also performed their previous hit song, "U". On the same day, the group confirmed to film You Hee-yeol's Sketchbook after 11 years since their last group appearance.

Sales and reception

Critical reception

The Renaissance was met with generally positive reception. On her NME review, Ruby C gave the album four out of five stars, stating that the majority of the album after "House Party" had "fall[en] neatly under two contrasting concepts" that "form[ed] an interesting paradox": songs that showed the band's musical evolution, and songs that "evoke nostalgia".

Track listing

Charts

Weekly charts

Year-end charts

References

SM Entertainment albums
Super Junior albums
2021 albums
Korean-language albums